Vanity is excessive self-regard and overblown pride.

Vanity may also refer to:
 Vanity (dressing-table), a dressing table with a large mirror
 Vanity (clothing), an American clothing retailer
 , the name of more than one ship of the British Royal Navy
 Vanity gallery, an art gallery for artists to present their works
 Vanity label, a recording produced by musicians themselves
 Vanity number, a kind of telephone number
 Vanity press, a publishing company that prints self-published works, provided the author pays the cost themselves
 "Vanity of vanities, all is vanity", the opening verse of Ecclesiastes
 Vanitas (Latin for vanity), a type of still life

Arts
 Vanity 6, musical group
 Vanity (comics), fictional city in the DC Comics universe
 Vanity (album), 2002 album by Eighteen Visions
 "Vanity" (1951 song), song by Jack Manus, Guy Wood and Bernard Bierman
 "Vanity", song by Lady Gaga, 2008
 "Vanity" (Christina Aguilera song), 2010
 Vanity (1927 film), American silent drama film
 Vanity (1935 film), British comedy film
 Vanity (1947 film), Italian film
 Vanity (2015 film), French / Swiss film
 Vanity (Titian), oil painting by Renaissance painter Titian

People
 Vanity (singer) (1959–2016), the stage name of singer/actress Denise Matthews

See also
 "The Golden Vanity", another name for the traditional folk song "The Sweet Trinity"
  The Golden Vanity (Britten), a 1966 setting of the traditional song by the Benjamin Britten
 Golden Vanity, a 1976 folk album by Martin Simpson
 Vanity Fair (disambiguation)